Angeln was a container ship which was built at Zhoushan Shipyard in 2004. She capsized and sank off Saint Lucia in February 2010.

Description
Angeln was built by Zhoushan Shipyard, China in 2004.

History
Angeln was owned by Brise Bereederungs GmbH & Co. KG, Hamburg, Germany. She was chartered by Bernuth Lines, Miami, Florida. She was allocated IMO Number 9298600. MMSI Number 304618000 and used the callsign V2BU2. In 2009, she was drydocked for examination by Germanischer Lloyd

Sinking
On 21 February 2010, Angeln departed Vieux Fort, Saint Lucia at about 21:00 local time (01:00 on 22 February UTC) bound for Barbados. She developed a list which rapidly increased. The order was given to abandon ship, which all 15 crew did successfully. Between 21:30 and 22:00, the ship capsized and sank. A salvage agreement was made with Titan Salvage under Lloyd's Open Form rules, but it was later decided that the ship was a constructive total loss. Titan were then awarded another contract to remove pollutants from the wreck. This work commenced on 4 March 2010, and completed on 21 April. The wreck has been designated a protected site by the Saint Lucia Air and Sea Ports Authority, who have issued a Wreck Removal Order.

References

2003 ships
Ships built in China
Merchant ships of Antigua and Barbuda
Maritime incidents in 2010
Shipwrecks in the Caribbean Sea